Mad Not Mad is the sixth studio album by English ska and pop band Madness. It was released on 30 September 1985, their first release on their own label Zarjazz, a sub-label of Virgin Records. The album was recorded over a period of two months in 1985 at Westside Studios and at AIR Studios, both in London. The album was their last recording of original material until they officially reformed in 1992.

The album peaked at No. 16 in the UK charts, and achieved silver status from the BPI. However, Mad Not Mad remains the band's poorest-selling studio album to date.

On its release the album was received favourably by the majority of music critics, although opinions have become much more negative in subsequent decades. After only a few weeks of its initial release, the writers of NME listed this album at number 55 on their list of the "100 Best Albums of All Time". The band themselves have been quite vocal that they were less satisfied with the album. In a BBC Radio 1 interview in 1993, their lead singer Suggs described Mad Not Mad as "a polished turd", referring to its distinctively glossy mid-1980s production by Clive Langer and Alan Winstanley, who had both produced all of Madness' work since the group's debut. In a 2009 interview Suggs said that with keyboardist Mike Barson gone they "slightly over-compensated, arrangement-wise and musician-wise" but there were "some great songs on that album, for sure".  However, NMEs view of the album is still favourable, including it in its 2015 list of "50 Albums Released in 1985 That Still Sound Great Today".

Content
Over the course of the album, the band both express their feelings and private problems, and address political issues. They touch on politics on "Burning the Boats", but also on a maturing disenchantment with the youth culture on "Yesterday's Men". It also features the satirical track "I'll Compete" which acknowledges their declining popularity and sales with the lyrics "Let us hurry now, time is catching up", and also exaggerates on them maturing with the line "I'm five years closer to my pension scheme".

Mad Not Mad features prolific guest backing vocalists, including the female trio Afrodiziak, and Jimmy Helms. The album is notably the band's only studio album not to feature their keyboardist and founding member Mike Barson, who had left the group the previous year to spend more time in Amsterdam with his then wife Sandra. Barson's keyboard parts were filled by synthesizers, and the album features session players Steve Nieve (keyboards) and Roy Davies (piano). After the album Madness disbanded in 1986, but Barson did join them for the recording of their one-off single "(Waiting For) The Ghost Train".

The album featured the songs "Yesterday's Men", "Uncle Sam", and "Sweetest Girl" which were all released as singles, with corresponding music videos. The three singles that were released all reached the Top 40 in the UK charts, however the latter two failed to make the Top 20, which was a first for any Madness single. The aforementioned "Sweetest Girl" was a cover version of a song by the British post-punk and new wave band Scritti Politti. In 1993, guitarist Chris Foreman revealed that the band had preferred to release "I'll Compete" as a single instead of "Sweetest Girl".

Release
Mad Not Mad was met with a lukewarm reception, especially on adult contemporary radio, being criticised for its over reliance on slow, dark and downbeat songs. The album was preceded by the song "Yesterday's Men" as the first single, reaching No. 18 in the UK. The album itself was released weeks later surprisingly only going to No. 16 in the UK, though it still went silver there. The track "Uncle Sam", released in October 1985 peaked at No. 21 in the UK (in a disappointing chart performance considering the lead singles from their previous albums were Top 20 hits in the UK). The third and final single, "Sweetest Girl", peaked at only No. 35 in the UK.

Critical reception

In a retrospective review for AllMusic, critic Darryl Cater wrote of the album "Clive Langer and Alan Wistanley occasionally strike an inspired balance between soulful pop and subtle reggae rhythms, but more often they replace the warmth of Barson's pianos with a cold emphasis on drum machines and synthesizers. Some of the songwriting, however, is on par with the band's most mature work, and the lively melodies lend a perfect irony to the band's wry social commentary and personal brooding." And reviewing for Record Collector critic, Terry Staunton wrote of the album "The Nutty Boys were veering towards an altogether gloomier form of nuttiness when this album first appeared in 1985. The wacky humour of old, already on the wane in their previous outing, Keep Moving, was almost totally eclipsed by sombre tones of resignation, best exemplified on the single Yesterday's Men." And The New Rolling Stone Album Guide wrote that the album "finds the lads sinking into [an] unseemly self-reflection".

Reissue
The album was re-released in the United Kingdom, in October 2010 on Virgin featuring rare bonus content. The reissue was a 3-disc set which comprises a 14-track CD with the original album digitally remastered from the original 1/2" mix tapes; alongside three bonus single remixes and '(Waiting For) The Ghost Train'; a bonus 10-track CD including demos of all the album's singles and their respective B-sides; plus a bonus DVD containing all the music videos for the singles as well as live performances from five BBC TV shows. It also features liner notes written by comedian and Madness fan, Phill Jupitus.

Track listing

2010 reissue
CD 1

Note
 "Sweetest Girl" (Extended Mix) is meant to be the extended mix from the "Sweetest Girl" 12" single but is actually the album version repeated instead.

CD 2

Personnel

Madness
 Graham "Suggs" McPherson – lead vocals
 Chris Foreman – guitars
 Mark Bedford – bass guitars
 Lee Thompson – saxophones
 Daniel Woodgate – drums, LinnDrum programming; keyboard sequences
 Cathal Smyth – backing vocals; lead vocals on "Tears You Can't Hide"

Additional musicians
 Steve Nieve – keyboards
 Roy Davies – piano
 Judd Lander – harmonica
 Luís Jardim – percussion
 Tom Morley – computer supervision
 Gary Barnacle – horns
 Afrodiziak (Caron Wheeler, Claudia Fontaine and Naomi Thompson) – backing Vocals
 Jimmy Helms – backing vocals
 Jimmy Thomas – backing vocals
 Jimmy Chambers – backing vocals
 David Bedford – strings and MD
 Trevor Ford – strings
 Rupert Bowden – strings
 Bill Benham – strings
 Belinda Blunt – strings
 Rusen Gunes – strings
 Adan Levine – strings
 Basil Smart – strings

Technical
 Clive Langer – producer
 Alan Winstanley – producer
 Matt Howe – associate producer 
 Mark Saunders – associate producer 
 Richard Sullivan – associate producer 
 Anton Corbijn – cover photograph
 Clare Müller – studio photographs
 John Stoddard – inner photograph
 Ian Wright – sleeve illustration
 Simon Halfon – sleeve design

2010 reissue personnel
 Lee Thompson – lead vocals on "Uncle Sam" (demo version) and "Maybe in Another Life"
 Mike Barson – keyboards on "(Waiting For) The Ghost Train"
 Jerry Dammers – keyboards on "All I Knew"
 Liquidator Productions (i.e. Madness) – producer on "Yesterday's Men" (demo version), "All I Knew", "Please Don't Go", "Uncle Sam" (demo version), "Jennie (A Portrait of)", "Maybe in Another Life" and "Call Me"
 Ian Horne – engineer on "Yesterday's Men" (demo version), "All I Knew", "Please Don't Go", "Uncle Sam" (demo version) and "Maybe in Another Life"
 Mark Saunders – engineer on "Maybe in Another Life"
 Tim Debney – remastering
 Ray Shulman – DVD authoring
 Jason Day – project manager, compilling
 Chris Peyton – reissue design
 Phill Jupitus – liner notes

Charts

Certifications and sales

See also
 List of albums released in 1985
 Madness' discography

References

External links
 

Madness (band) albums
1985 albums
Zarjazz albums
Albums produced by Alan Winstanley
Albums produced by Clive Langer
Albums recorded at AIR Studios